Grand Power s.r.o. is a Slovak defence supplier specializing in the design and manufacturing of firearms and tactical components such as sound suppressors. The company is based in Banská Bystrica.

The company exports almost 95% of its production. The remaining 5% are sold in Slovakia.

Grand Power is the manufacturer of the K100 pistol, known by their rare rotating barrel locking system.

The Grand Power STRIBOG is under evaluation by the US Army.

The Stribog AP9 A3S variant was submitted to be evaluated for the US Army's Sub Compact Weapon (SCW) program. However, Stribog eventually lost to the Brugger and Thomet APC9K.

See also
 Grand Power K100

References

External links
 Official website

Companies established in 2002
Companies of Slovakia